S.S.C. Napoli had a disappointing Serie A title defence, where captain Diego Maradona failed a drugs test and would not play for the club again. The reliable home form of the 1989-90 season disappeared, whilst the European Cup dream ended already in the Last 16 against Spartak Moscow. The team did, however, win the Supercoppa, which was the final title of the club's successful Maradona era.

Squad

Transfers

Special kit
For the Supercoppa the team wore a special kit.
{| width=92% |
|-
|

Competitions

Supercoppa

Serie A

League table

Results by round

Matches

Top scorers
  Careca 9
  Diego Maradona 6
  Giuseppe Incocciati 6
  Gianfranco Zola 4

Coppa Italia

Second round

Eightfinals

Quarterfinals

Semifinals

European Cup 

Eightfinals

Statistics

Players statistics

References

S.S.C. Napoli seasons
Napoli